Dr Bijoy Kumar Mondal (born 1 December 1924) is an Indian politician. He was elected to the Lok Sabha, lower house of the Parliament of India from Bankura, West Bengal in the 1977 Indian general election as a member of the Janata Party.

References

External links
Official biographical sketch in Parliament of India website

India MPs 1977–1979
Lok Sabha members from West Bengal
Janata Party politicians
1924 births
People from Bankura district
Possibly living people
Bharatiya Jana Sangh politicians
Hindu Mahasabha politicians